Converging Conspiracies is the second album by the Swedish death metal band Comecon. It was released in 1993 on Century Media records. Contrary to the album credits, the drums were recorded using a drum computer; Fredrik Pålsson who is listed as a drummer does not exist. The photograph shows an unrecognizable friend of the band. The cover art is the painting by Zdzislaw Beksinski.

Track listing
  "Democrator"   – 4:15
  "The Ethno-Surge"  – 3:13
  "Community"  – 3:43
  "Aerie"  – 4:21
  "Bleed/Burn"  – 3:52
  "Morticide"  – 3:24
  "Worms"  – 3:35
  "Pinhole View"  – 3:31
  "The Whole World"  – 4:06
  "God Told Me To"  – 2:02  (Dr. Know cover)
  "Dipstick"  – 3:59
  "The House That Man Built"  – 5:10

Credits
 Rasmus Ekman – guitar, bass
 Pelle Ström – guitar, bass
 Martin van Drunen – vocals

Comecon (band) albums
1993 albums